The following is a list of Universal Wrestling Association Alumni, that is wrestlers that have at some point worked for the Mexican professional wrestling promotion Universal Wrestling Association (UWA) that existed from 1975 until 1995.

Male

Female

Mini-Estrellas

Teams and Stables

References

General references

Lucha libre
Universal Wrestling Association alumni